Reinhold Sulzbacher (born 29 July 1944 in Liezen) was an Austrian luger who competed in the late 1970s and early 1980s. He won the gold medal in the men's doubles event at the 1982 FIL European Luge Championships in Winterberg, West Germany.

Sulzbacher also won the men's doubles overall Luge World Cup title three times (1979–80, 1980–1, 1981-2).

Competing in two Winter Olympics, Sulzbacher earned his best finish of fifth in the men's doubles event at Innsbruck in 1976.

References

1976 Winter Olympic men's doubles results.
1980 Winter Olympic men's doubles results.
List of men's doubles luge World Cup champions since 1978.
Profile on sports-reference.com

1944 births
Living people
Austrian male lugers
Olympic lugers of Austria
Lugers at the 1976 Winter Olympics
Lugers at the 1980 Winter Olympics
People from Liezen District
Sportspeople from Styria